Akers may refer to:

People
Akers (surname)

Places
In the United States:
Akers, Missouri, in Shannon County
Akers Pond in New Hampshire
Akers, Louisiana

Other uses
Akers' clasp, for removable partial dentures

See also
Aker (disambiguation)
Acker
Ackers